This article contains a list of military tactics.

The meaning of the phrase is context sensitive, and has varied over time, like the difference between "strategy" and "tactics".

General

 Exploiting prevailing weather – the tactical use of weather as a force multiplier has influenced many important battles throughout history, such as the Battle of Waterloo.
 Fire attacks – reconnaissance by fire is used by apprehensive soldiers when they suspect the enemy is nearby.
 Force concentration – the practice of concentrating a military force against a portion of an enemy force.
 Night combat – combat that takes place at night. It often requires more preparation than combat during daylight and can provide significant tactical advantages and disadvantages to both the attacker and defender.
 Reconnaissance – a mission to obtain information by visual observation or other detection methods, about the activities and resources of the enemy or potential enemy, or about the meteorologic, hydrographic, or geographic characteristics of a particular area.
 Smoke screening – the practice of creating clouds of smoke positioned to provide concealment, allowing military forces to advance or retreat across open terrain without coming under direct fire from the enemy.

Eight classic maneuvers of warfare

 Penetration of the center: This involves exploiting a gap in the enemy line to drive directly to the enemy's command or base. Two ways of accomplishing this are separating enemy forces then using a reserve to exploit the gap (e.g. Battle of Chaeronea (338 BC)) or having fast, elite forces smash at a weak spot (or an area where your elites are at their best in striking power) and using reserves to hold the line while the elite forces continue forward, exploiting the gap immediately (i.e., blitzkrieg).
 Attack from a defensive position: Establishing a strong defensive position from which to defend and attack your opponent (e.g., Siege of Alesia and the Battle of the Granicus). However, the defensive can become too passive and result in ultimate defeat.
 Single envelopment: A strong flank beating its opponent opposite and, with the aid of holding attacks, attack an opponent in the rear. Sometimes, the establishment of a strong, hidden force behind a weak flank will prevent your opponent from carrying out their own single envelopment (e.g., Battle of Rocroi).
 Double envelopment: Both flanks defeat their opponent opposite and launch a rear attack on the enemy center. Its most famous use was Hannibal's tactical masterpiece, the Battle of Cannae and was frequently used by the Wehrmacht on the Eastern Front of World War II. It was also executed to perfection by Khalid ibn al-Walid in the decisive Battle of Yarmuk in 636 AD.
 Attack in oblique order: This involves placing your flanks in a slanted fashion (refusing one's flank) or giving a vast part of your force to a single flank (e.g., Battle of Leuthen). The latter can be disastrous, however, due to the imbalance of force.
 Feigned retreat: Having a frontal force fake a retreat, drawing the opponent in pursuit and then launching an assault with strong force held in reserve (such as the Battle of Maling and the Battle of Hastings). However, a feigned retreat may devolve into a real one, such as in the Battle of Grunwald.
 Indirect approach: Having a minority of your force demonstrate in front of your opponent while the majority of your force advance from a hidden area and attack the enemy in the rear or flank (e.g., Battle of Chancellorsville).
 Crossing the "T": a classic naval maneuver which maximizes one side's offensive firepower while minimizing that of the opposing force (e.g., Battle of Trafalgar).

Tactics

Deceptive

In the 4th century BCE, Sun Tzu said "the Military is a Tao of deception". Diversionary attacks, feints, decoys; there are thousands of tricks that have been successfully used in warfare, and still have a role in the modern day.
 Deception and misdirection
 Deception:
 Perfidy: Combatants tend to have assumptions and ideas of rules and fair practices in combat, but the ones who raise surrender flags to lure their attackers in the open, or who act as stretcher bearers to deceive their targets, tend to be especially disliked.
 False flag: An ancient ruse de guerre – in the days of sail, it was permissible for a warship to fly the flag of an enemy power, so long as it properly hoisted its true colors before attacking. Wearing enemy uniforms and using enemy equipment to infiltrate or achieve surprise is also permissible though they can be punished as spies if caught behind enemy lines.
 Demoralization (warfare): A process in psychological warfare that can encourage them to retreat, surrender, or defect rather than defeating them in combat.
 Disinformation
 Military camouflage
 Stealth technology
 Feint or diversionary attacks
 Electronic warfare
 Electronic countermeasures
 Electronic counter-countermeasures
 Radio silence – while traveling, a fleet will refrain from communicating by radio to avoid detection by enemy forces.
 Force multiplication
 Use of surprise
 Parthian shot
 Hit-and-run tactics
 Irregular warfare

Defensive

Offensive

Small unit

See also

 Military strategy
 Tactical formation
 List of military strategies and concepts
 List of established military terms
 List of military operations

References

External links
 Tactical

Tactics